Mike Starr  is an American character actor. Tall and burly with a deep voice, Starr often performs as mobsters, police officers, blue-collar workers or tough guys. He was a regular cast member on The Young and the Restless and Ed, and made appearances in the films Goodfellas, Dumb and Dumber, and Billy Bathgate.

Early life
Michael Starr was born in Queens, New York, and grew up in Flushing. He is of Irish and Polish descent.

Career
Starr has featured in notable films such as Goodfellas, The Bodyguard, Ed Wood, Miller's Crossing, Jersey Girl, Cabin Boy, Dumb and Dumber, The Last Dragon and The Ice Harvest.

Filmography

Filmography

Television

References

External links
 

Living people
People from Flushing, Queens
Hofstra University alumni
20th-century American male actors
21st-century American male actors
American male film actors
American male television actors
American people of Irish descent
American people of Polish descent
Male actors from New York City
Year of birth missing (living people)